Kunta Kinte ( –) is a character in the 1976 novel Roots: The Saga of an American Family by American author Alex Haley. Kunta Kinte was based on one of Haley's ancestors, a Gambian man who was born around 1750, enslaved, and taken to America where he died around 1822. Haley said that his account of Kunta's life in Roots is a mixture of fact and fiction.

Kunta Kinte's life story figured in two US television series based on the book: the original 1977 TV miniseries Roots, and a 2016 remake of the same name. In the original miniseries, the character was portrayed as a teenager by LeVar Burton and as an adult by John Amos. In the 2016 miniseries, he is portrayed by Malachi Kirby. Burton reprised his role in the 1988 TV movie Roots: The Gift.

Biography in Roots novel
According to the book Roots, Kunta Kinte was born circa 1750 in the Mandinka village of Jufureh, in the Gambia. He was raised in a Muslim family. In 1767, while Kunta was searching for wood to make a drum for his younger brother, four men chased him, surrounded him, and took him captive. Kunta awoke to find himself blindfolded, gagged, bound, and a prisoner. He and others were put on the slave ship the Lord Ligonier for a four-month Middle Passage voyage to North America.

Kunta survived the trip to Maryland and was sold to a John Waller (1741-1775), son of William Waller (1714-1760) and grandson of John Waller (1673-1754) (Reynolds in the 1977 miniseries), a Virginia plantation owner in Spotsylvania County, who renamed him Toby (named by John's wife Elizabeth in the 2016 remake). He rejected the name imposed upon him by his owners and refused to speak to others.  After being recaptured during the last of his four escape attempts, the slave catchers gave him a choice: he would be castrated or have his right foot cut off. He chose to have his foot cut off, and the men cut off the front half of his right foot. As the years passed, Kunta, now owned by John's brother Dr. William Waller, resigned himself to his fate and became more open and sociable with his fellow slaves, while never forgetting his identity and origin.

Kunta married an enslaved woman named Belle Waller and they had a daughter named Kizzy (Keisa, in Mandinka), which in Kunta's native language means "to stay put", to protect her from being sold away. When Kizzy was in her late teens, she was sold away to North Carolina when William Waller discovered that she had written a fake traveling pass for an enslaved young man, Noah, with whom she was in love. She had been taught to read and write secretly by Missy Anne, the niece of the plantation owner. Her new owner, Thomas Lea (Moore in the 1977 miniseries), immediately raped her. He fathered her only child, whom he named George after his first slave (or after his own father, according to the 2016 miniseries). George spent his life with the tag "Chicken George", because of his assigned duties of tending to his master's cockfighting birds.

In the novel, Kizzy never learns her parents' fate. She spends the remainder of her life as a field hand on the Lea plantation in North Carolina. According to the 1977 miniseries, Kizzy is taken back to visit the Reynolds plantation later in life. She discovers that her mother was sold off to another plantation and that her father died of a broken heart two years later, in 1822. She finds his grave, on which she crosses out his slave name Toby and writes his real name Kunta Kinte instead. Kizzy is Haley's only ancestor in the genealogy link to Kunta Kinte, who spent the majority of his life in slavery.

The latter part of the book tells of the generations between Kizzy and Alex Haley, describing their suffering, losses, and eventual triumphs in America. Alex Haley claimed to be a seventh-generation descendant of Kunta Kinte.

Historical accuracy

Haley claimed that his sources for the origins of Kinte were oral family tradition and a man he found in the Gambia named Kebba Kanga Fofana, who claimed to be a griot with knowledge about the Kinte clan. He described them as a family in which the men were blacksmiths, descended from a marabout named Kairaba Kunta Kinte, originally from Mauritania. Haley quoted Fofana as telling him: "About the time the king's soldiers came, the eldest of these four sons, Kunta, went away from this village to chop wood and was never seen again."

However, journalists and historians later discovered that Fofana was not a griot. In retelling the Kinte story, Fofana changed crucial details, including his father's name, his brothers' names, his age, and even omitted the year when he went missing. At one point, he even placed Kunta Kinte in a generation that was alive in the twentieth century. It was also discovered that elders and griots could not give reliable genealogical lineages before the mid-19th century, with the single apparent exception of Kunta Kinte. It appears that Haley had told so many people about Kunta Kinte that he had created a case of circular reporting. Instead of independent confirmation of the Kunta Kinte story, he was actually hearing his own words repeated back to him.

After Haley's book became nationally famous, American author Harold Courlander noted that the section describing Kinte's life was apparently taken from Courlander's own 1967 novel The African. Haley at first dismissed the charge, but later issued a public statement affirming that Courlander's book had been the source, and Haley attributed the error to a mistake of one of his assistant researchers. Courlander sued Haley for copyright infringement, which Haley settled out of court.

However, despite the inconsistencies with Haley's chronology, Kunta Kinte was probably a real person. According to historian John Thornton, director of the African American Studies program at Boston University (who served as a historical advisor to the 2016 remake of Roots), the historical Kunta Kinte was indeed from the town of Jufureh, which was then part of the Kingdom of Niumi, and was from a Muslim Jula family which had moved there a generation before his birth. He came from a family of merchants who were involved in all matters of commerce, including the slave trade. He was sold into slavery around 1767. It is remarkable that he was sold into slavery given his family's social status as middle class merchants, as well as the ongoing debate at the time regarding whether it was permissible to sell Muslims as slaves to Christians, and his being sold into slavery possibly had something to do with inter-factional disputes among the Jula or traders, as well as the dispute Kingdom of Niumi had with a Royal African Company trading post at the time, during which the two sides seized hostages.

In popular culture

Kunta Kinte has inspired a reggae riddim of the same name. This started off life as a track called Beware Of Your Enemies released from Jamaica's Channel One. A dub version, put out in 1976 by Channel One house band The Revolutionaries became a sound system anthem for many years on dubplate, and inspired a UK version produced by Mad Professor in 1981. It has also inspired jungle covers.

There is an annual Kunta Kinte Heritage Festival held in Maryland.

The 1988 comedy film Coming to America jokingly references Kunta Kinte, in an homage to Roots (John Amos, who played a supporting role in Coming to America as the father of the protagonist's love interest, played the adult version of Kunta Kinte in the 1977 miniseries).

Ice Cube mentions Kunta Kinte in his 1991 song No Vaseline where he disses members of his former group N.W.A where he compares MC Ren to Kunta Kinte stating "So don't believe what Ren say. 'Cause he's goin' out like Kunte Kinte".

Kendrick Lamar's 2015 song "King Kunta" was inspired by the character. Afrikan Boy released a song called Mr. Kunta Kinte in 2016 

Athlete Colin Kaepernick wore a T-shirt with "Kunta Kinte" emblazoned on it to a controversial NFL workout. In CNN's interpretation, "Kaepernick appeared to use the reference to make a statement: He will not change who he is to appease the powers that be."

See also
 Kunta Kinteh Island in the Gambia
 List of slaves

References

External links
The Kunta Kinte-Alex Haley Foundation

Roots: The Saga of an American Family
Characters in American novels of the 20th century
Fictional African-American people
Fictional amputees
Fictional characters based on real people
Fictional Gambian people
Fictional immigrants to the United States
Fictional Muslims
Fictional people from the 18th-century
Fictional people from the 19th-century
Fictional slaves
Literary characters introduced in 1976